This is a list of transforms in mathematics.

Integral transforms
Abel transform
Bateman transform
Fourier transform
Short-time Fourier transform
Gabor transform
Hankel transform
Hartley transform
Hermite transform
Hilbert transform
Hilbert–Schmidt integral operator
Jacobi transform
Laguerre transform
Laplace transform
Inverse Laplace transform
Two-sided Laplace transform
Inverse two-sided Laplace transform
Laplace–Carson transform
Laplace–Stieltjes transform
Legendre transform
Linear canonical transform
Mellin transform
Inverse Mellin transform
Poisson–Mellin–Newton cycle
N-transform
Radon transform
Stieltjes transformation
Sumudu transform
Wavelet transform (integral)
Weierstrass transform

Discrete transforms
Binomial transform
Discrete Fourier transform, DFT
Fast Fourier transform, a popular implementation of the DFT
Discrete cosine transform
Modified discrete cosine transform
Discrete Hartley transform
Discrete sine transform
Discrete wavelet transform
Hadamard transform (or, Walsh–Hadamard transform)
Fast wavelet transform
Hankel transform, the determinant of the Hankel matrix
Discrete Chebyshev transform
Equivalent, up to a diagonal scaling, to a discrete cosine transform
Finite Legendre transform
Spherical Harmonic transform
Irrational base discrete weighted transform
Number-theoretic transform
Stirling transform

Discrete-time transforms
These transforms have a continuous frequency domain:
Discrete-time Fourier transform
Z-transform

Data-dependent transforms
Karhunen–Loève transform

Other transforms
Affine transformation (computer graphics)
Bäcklund transform
Bilinear transform
Box–Muller transform
Burrows–Wheeler transform (data compression)
Chirplet transform
Distance transform
Fractal transform
Gelfand transform
Hadamard transform
Hough transform (digital image processing)
Inverse scattering transform
Legendre transformation
Möbius transformation
Perspective transform (computer graphics)
Sequence transform
Watershed transform (digital image processing)
Wavelet transform (orthonormal)
Y-Δ transform (electrical circuits)

See also
List of Fourier-related transforms
Transform coding

External links
Tables of Integral Transforms at EqWorld: The World of Mathematical Equations.

Mathematics-related lists
 
Image processing